The Institute of Environmental Management and Assessment (IEMA) is the largest professional body for environmental practitioners in the United Kingdom and worldwide, with nearly 20,000 members.

Members receive updates on current environmental law and legislation, and the group organises over 100 regional events on environmental topics to communicate current best practice guidance. It also publishes The Environmentalist magazine 12 times a year, publishes the Practitioner best practice workbooks on individual environmental themes, and organises national conferences that feature national experts and opinion.

IEMA membership aims to ensure that candidates are knowledgeable, competent and highly trained. Environmental jobs are listed on IEMA's website at. Organisations are challenged to operate in an environmentally considerate fashion, and the UK Government's agenda on climate change and a low carbon and resource efficient economy has meant that IEMA is consulted on major issues, with IEMA involving its members in a majority of these consultations.

IEMA is a constituent body of the Society for the Environment (SocEnv), which enables IEMA members to progress  to Chartered Environmentalist status.

IEMA is the Competent Body in the UK for the European Union's Eco-Management and Audit Scheme (EMAS). IEMA also promotes the Acorn Scheme (BS 8555), the phased approach to the ISO 14001 environmental management system.

IEMA also approves training course providers to deliver environmental training. There are currently over 80 IEMA-approved training providers.

The Environmentalist
The Environmentalist (now renamed "Transform") is a magazine for environmental professionals, published 10 times per year by the Institute of Environmental Management and Assessment in the UK. Topics include news, policy, environmental law, best practice and institute news. It is sent free of charge to members of IEMA.

References

External links

Environmental organisations based in the United Kingdom
Organisations based in Lincolnshire
Environmental Management and Assessment
Science and technology in Lincolnshire